Step Up 3D (Original Motion Picture Soundtrack) is the film soundtrack for the film Step Up 3D. It was released on July 27, 2010, by Atlantic Records.

Track listing

Tracks not listed
There are many tracks that were not listed in the soundtrack.

Charts

Weekly charts

Year-end charts

References

External links
Official website

Step Up (film series) albums
2010 soundtrack albums
2010s film soundtrack albums
Hip hop soundtracks
Dance music soundtracks
Atlantic Records soundtracks
Albums produced by Tha Bizness